The 1939 Football Championship of UkrSSR were part of the 1939 Soviet republican football competitions in the Soviet Ukraine.

Persha Hrupa
Promoted
 (Tretia Hrupa) Stakhanovets Ordzhonikidze
 (debut) Lokomotyv zavodiv Zaporizhia
 (reinstated) Lokomotyv Dnipropetrovsk
Replaced: Dynamo Mykolaiv → Sudnobudivnyk Mykolaiv

Druha Hrupa
Promoted: Zenit Voroshylovhrad (debut)
Relegated: Spartak Kryvyi Rih, Kryla Rad Zaporizhia, Spartak Dnipropetrovsk
Returning: Stakhanovets Sergo

 Before the season there withdrew Spartak Kryvyi Rih, Kryla Rad Zaporizhia, Spartak Dnipropetrovsk, Stal Voroshylovsk.

Tretia Hrupa
Relegated: Spartak Chernihiv

Ukrainian clubs at the All-Union level
 Group A (3): Dynamo Kyiv, Stakhanovets Stalino, Dynamo Odesa
 Group B (7): Silmash Kharkiv, Lokomotyv Kyiv, Spartak Kharkiv, Dynamo Kharkiv (reinstated), Sudnobudivnyk Mykolaiv (reinstated), Stal Dnipropetrovsk (reinstated), Dzerzhynets Voroshylovhrad (debut)

Withdrawn
 (all-Union level) Stal (z-d im. Lenina) Dnipropetrovsk, Dynamo Dnipropetrovsk, Traktor Kharkiv, Spartak Kyiv
 (Republican) Spartak Kryvyi Rih, Kryla Rad Zaporizhia, Spartak Dnipropetrovsk, Stal Voroshylovsk, Kharchovyk Tiraspol, Temp Vinnytsia, Krasnyi Luch, Makiivka, Chystiakove, Melitopol, Berdiansk, Stakhanovets Krasnoarmiysk, Lokomotyv Synelnykove, Berdychiv, Novohrad-Volynskyi, Korosten, Mohyliv-Podilskyi, Uman, Koziatyn, Znannia Kherson, Voznesensk, Kremenchuk, Konotop, Smila, z-d im. Lenina Verkhiy, Stakhanovets Lysychansk, Kupiansk, Starobilsk, Lokomotyv Lozova, Artemivsk, Sloviansk

See also
 1939 Cup of the Ukrainian SSR

References

External links
 1939. Football Championship of the UkrSSR (1939. Первенство УССР.) Luhansk Nash Futbol.
 1939 (1939 год). History of Soviet championships among KFK.

Ukraine
Football Championship of the Ukrainian SSR
Championship